is a railway station in Aki-ku, Hiroshima, Hiroshima Prefecture, Japan, operated by West Japan Railway Company (JR West).

Lines
Seno Station is served by the Sanyō Main Line.

Layout
The station consists of two island platforms located on the ground level. The station office is above the platforms and the tracks.

See also
 List of railway stations in Japan

External links

  

Railway stations in Hiroshima Prefecture
Stations of West Japan Railway Company in Hiroshima city
Sanyō Main Line
Railway stations in Japan opened in 1894